Dog Gone People is a 1960 Warner Bros. Merrie Melodies cartoon animated short directed by Robert McKimson. The short was released on November 12, 1960 and features Elmer Fudd.

Elmer is voiced by Hal Smith, as Arthur Q. Bryan had died the previous year.

The main plot revolves around Elmer doing a favor to his boss by watching his dog, Rupert, during an out-of-town trip ... the catch being that Rupert behaves as though he is a human and expects to be treated accordingly, and that Elmer must do everything he can to not offend his guest or risk losing out on more than just a work promotion.

Summary
Elmer receives a phone call from his demanding boss, Mr. Crabtree, asking him to watch his dog, Rupert, while he goes on vacation. Crabtree admonishes Fudd that Rupert thinks he's human and expects to be treated like one, then informs him that there are two ways to go in the company -- "up (clears his throat) ... or down!" If Fudd does a good job, there may be a vice presidency available at the company for him, Crabtree continues.

Elmer does everything he can to not offend Rupert, but unwittingly fails at the simplest, seemingly banal tasks. First, Fudd turns on the TV so the two of them can watch Classie, with Fudd stopping Rupert only after reminding him that humans also enjoy watching an adventure series about a dog. Later, Fudd—fixing himself a steak—feeds Rupert dog food, prompting the irritated mutt to once again walk out; Fudd appeases his guest only after eating the dog food himself! That night, when Rupert tries to sleep on the bed, Fudd tries to shoo him out, only for the dog to call his boss to report the offense; a frustrated Fudd, reminded of the consequences of doing an unacceptable job caring for Rupert, winds up sleeping in the dog bed.

The next morning, as Elmer is fixing breakfast, Rupert gets into the medicine cabinet and drinks bay rum (because he saw Fudd gargling mouthwash and does the same thing). When Elmer sees that Rupert is drunk, he takes him out for a ride to sober him up. However, Rupert gets control of the car and speeds through town, terrifying Fudd as Rupert drives through stores and causes a major accident. In the end, a motorcycle cop pulls Rupert over and both the dog and Elmer are charged with driving while intoxicated.

When Crabtree posts bail for Elmer and Rupert, he tells Fudd that he will be moving up ... "up, up, up, up" in the company. Elmer indeed does move up—to the top of the flag pole atop the E.J. Crabtree office skyscraper. As Elmer bitterly muses that he thought he was going to be vice president, the appointee for the position—none other than Rupert—is sitting comfortably at his new desk.

References

External links

Elmer Fudd films
Merrie Melodies short films
Films directed by Robert McKimson
1960 animated films
1960 short films
1960 films
Films scored by Milt Franklyn
Animated films about dogs
1960s Warner Bros. animated short films
1960s English-language films